Paul Gerard Nastasiuk (born July 11, 1963 in Newmarket, Ontario) is a Canadian retired professional football player.

Nastasiuk played seven seasons in the Canadian Football League. He won the Grey Cup as a member of the 1991 Toronto Argonauts team.

Nastasiuk was inducted into the Wilfrid Laurier University Golden Hawk Hall of Fame in 2000, and into the Barrie Sports Hall of Fame 2008.

Family
His son, Zach Nastasiuk (born March 30, 1995), was drafted by the Detroit Red Wings in the 2013 NHL Draft, being drafted 48th overall. Zach currently plays junior hockey in the Ontario Hockey League with the Owen Sound Attack.

References

1963 births
BC Lions players
Canadian schoolteachers
Living people
Sportspeople from Newmarket, Ontario
Players of Canadian football from Ontario
Sportspeople from Barrie
Toronto Argonauts players
Wilfrid Laurier Golden Hawks football players